Janwillem van den Berg (26 November 1920 in Akkrum – 18 October 1985 in Groningen) was a Dutch speech scientist and medical physicist who played a major role in establishing the myoelastic-aerodynamic theory of voice production. The most notable aspect of van den Berg's theory is its impact on modern speech science in providing a foundation for modern models of vocal fold function.

Van den Berg designed the first implantable pacemaker that could be switched to a higher beat rate for a higher level of activity. The first experiments for an R-top triggered pacemaker were done, and the design of electrodes to the heart was tested in animal experiments. This made Van den Berg known to the cardiologists of that time.

Literature 
 Van den Berg, J. (1958). Myoelastic-aerodynamic Theory of Voice production, Journal of Speech and Hearing Research 3(1): 227–244.
 Titze, I. R. (2006). The Myoelastic Aerodynamic Theory of Phonation, Iowa City: National Center for Voice and Speech, 2006.

References 

1920 births
1985 deaths
20th-century Dutch physicists
Speech production researchers
Phonation
People from Boarnsterhim
20th-century Dutch physicians
Medical physicists